The Cuenca de Pamplona is a comarca in Navarre, Spain. The Spanish word cuenca means 'basin', referring to a 'territory surrounded of mountains or hills'. The metropolitan area of Pamplona grows in detriment of the ceralistic countryside.

Municipalities
Ansoáin, Aranguren, Barañáin, Belascoáin, Beriáin, Berrioplano, Berriozar, Bidaurreta, Burlada, Ciriza, Cizur, Echarri, Egüés, Etxauri, Galar, Goñi, Huarte, Iza, Juslapeña, Noáin - Valle de Elorz, Ollo, Olza, Orcoyen, Pamplona, Tiebas-Muruarte de Reta, Villava – Atarrabia, Zabalza and Zizur Mayor/Zizur Nagusia.

See also
Gazólaz
Mancomunidad de la Comarca de Pamplona

References 

Comarcas of Navarre